The Type 101 Hamburg class was the only class of destroyers built during post-war Germany.  They were specifically designed to operate in the Baltic Sea, where armament and speed is more important than seaworthiness. They were named after Bundesländer (states of Germany) of West Germany.

Design 
The German shipyard Stülcken was contracted to design and build the ships. Stülcken was rather inexperienced with naval shipbuilding, but got the order, since the shipyards traditionally building warships for the German navies like Blohm + Voss, Howaldtswerke or Lürssen were all occupied constructing commercial vessels (no naval ship had been built in Germany since World War II).

Originally, they had only barreled weapons, but from 1976 to 1978 they were upgraded with guided missiles to increase their effectiveness against modern surface warships and were re designated Type 101A.  One 100 mm gun was replaced by two Exocet missile launchers, the Bofors were replaced by Breda 40 mm, and the torpedo tubes were removed. Modifications were also made to the operations center, radar and bridge.

The design of the Hamburg class has been criticized for many of the same failures of the Kriegsmarine destroyers: too top-heavy and bad sea-keeping capabilities. This is in part due to the low freeboard on the hull. They were replaced up from 1994 by the Brandenburg class frigates (F123).

Ships

All ships were built by Stülcken and were based in Wilhelmshaven as the 2. Zerstörergeschwader (second destroyer squadron) of the Bundesmarine/Deutsche Marine (German Navy).

See also

Citations

References
Gerhard Koop/Siegfried Breyer: Die Schiffe, Fahrzeuge und Flugzeuge der deutschen Marine 1956 bis heute. Bernard & Graefe Verlag, München 1996, ISBN 3-7637-5950-6

External links

 Zerstörer Hamburg Klasse - Die Marine (official Homepage of the German Navy) - in German
 Hamburg Klasse - in German
 Zerstörer Hamburg - in German
 Zerstörer Hamburg - in German
 Zerstöer Schleswig-Holstein - in German
 Zerstörer Bayern - in German
 Happy-Hessen - in German
 Zerstörer Hessen - in German
 Type 101 Hamburg @ GlobalSecurity.org